The Pittsfield Colts were a minor league baseball team based in Pittsfield, Massachusetts. In 1894, the Colts briefly played as members of the Class B level New York State League, hosting home games at Wahconah Park. The Colts folded during the 1894 season and were succeeded by the 1905 Pittsfield Hillies.

History
Pittsfield has a deep baseball history. In 2004, baseball historian John Thorn discovered a reference to a 1791 by-law prohibiting anyone from playing "baseball" within  of a newly built meeting house in Pittsfield. The 1791 document, would be, as of 2004, the earliest known reference to the game in America. (See Origins of baseball.) The document is available on the Pittsfield Library's web site. According to Thorn, the document makes it clear that not only was "baseball" played in 1791 Pittsfield, it was played enough to have a written ordinance against it to protect the new building.

The Pittsfield Colts began minor league baseball play in 1894. The Colts joined the Albany Senators, Amsterdam Carpet Tacks, Johnstown Buckskins, Kingston Patriarchs and Poughkeepsie Bridge Citys in beginning New York State League play on May 12, 1894. In the era, the Class B level league was the second highest level of minor league play.

The Pittsfield Colts of the New York State League ended their 1894 season on July 3, 1894. On that date, with a record of 13–17, Pittsfield folded, along with Albany, leaving the league with four remaining teams. George Roberts and Edward Cain served as the Pittsfield managers during the short season. Pittsfield players Ira Davis, Mike Hickey, Frank McPartlin, John Pappalau and Pussy Tebeau all saw time playing in the major leagues.

The Amsterdam Carpet Tacks eventually won the 1894 New York State League championship, finishing 2.5 games ahead of the 2nd place Poughkeepsie Bridge Citys and 3.5 games ahead of the 3rd place Johnstown Buckskins.

Pittsfield was the only 1894 New York State League team located out of the state of New York, and the club faced financial issues due in part to bad weather causing the cancellation of home games at Wahconah Park.

The Colts were succeeded by the 1905 Pittsfield Hillies, who began play as members of the Hudson River League and continued play at Wahconah Park.

The ballpark
The Pittsfield Colts played 1894 minor league home games at Wahconah Park. The ballpark was built in 1892 and the early park was later reconstructed. The historic ballpark is still in use today.  Wahconah Park was listed on the National Register of Historic Places in 2005 and is located at 143 Wahconah Street.

Year–by–year records

Notable alumni

Ira Davis (1894)
Mike Hickey (1894)
Frank McPartlin (1894)
John Pappalau (1894)
Pussy Tebeau (1894)

See also
Pittsfield Colts players

References

External links
 Baseball Reference
Wahconah Park photos - digitalballparks.com
Wahconah Park photos - BallparkReviews.com

Defunct minor league baseball teams
Defunct baseball teams in New York (state)
New York State League teams
Baseball teams established in 1894
Baseball teams disestablished in 1894
Professional baseball teams in New York (state)
Baseball teams in Pittsfield, Massachusetts